Diamond Mountain may refer to:
 Mount Kumgang, a mountain in North Korea
 Diamond Mountain District AVA, an American Viticultural Area located in California
 Diamond Mountain Center, a Tibetan Buddhist seminary and retreat center located in Arizona

See also
Diamond Mountains
Diamond Hill (disambiguation)
Diamond Peak (disambiguation)